Nokia Arena may refer to:

 Nokia Arena (Tampere), Finland
 Nokia Arena (Tel Aviv), Israel